Grand Slam (original title: Ad ogni costo) is a 1967 Italian-Spanish-German heist film directed by Giuliano Montaldo and starring Edward G. Robinson, Klaus Kinski and Janet Leigh.

Plot
A seemingly mild-mannered teacher, Professor James Anders, is an American working in Rio de Janeiro. Bored with years of teaching, Anders retires and sets about putting together a team to pull off a diamond heist during the Rio Carnival in Brazil.

With the help of a youthhood friend, now a successful criminal, Anders recruits a team of four international experts to carry out the robbery: Gregg an English safecracking specialist, Agostino an Italian mechanical and electronics genius, Jean Paul a French playboy (whose job it is to seduce the only woman with a key to the building holding the diamonds, the lovely Mary Ann), and Erich a German ex-military man (at the movie's ending, it will become clear that Anders' young friend had ordered the German to kill the other members of the team after the job is finished).

The team develops a series of mechanical devices to defeat the layers of protection built within the building in which the diamonds are stored, mainly photocells which crisscross the entry corridor, and the new "Grand Slam 70" safe system: an alarm triggered by any sound detected near the safe room by means of a sensitive microphone listens for sounds while the safe and its environs are secured. Although the presence of the latter system is found by the team only one day in advance and at first this seems to impose a stop to the entire action, Agostino is able to find a genial solution to overcome the problem, so that the action can start.

The team successfully enters the safe using a pneumatic trestle to bypass the photocell beams by crawling over them, accesses to the safe room with the Mary Ann's key stolen by Jean Pauland, move the safe to the corridor using shaving cream to dampen their sounds, and finally open the safe with specific nitroglycerin charges. However, the following day the police are alerted by Mary Ann, who has found that the safe key had been temporarily taken, and all the four members of the team are killed during their escape.

Anders ends up with the diamonds in a small letters case, sitting in an outdoor cafe...but loses them in the film's last scene in Rome to a thief gang on a motorcycle.

Cast
 Janet Leigh as Mary Ann
 Edward G. Robinson as Professor James Anders
 Robert Hoffmann as Jean-Paul Audry
 Klaus Kinski as Erich Weiss
 Riccardo Cucciolla as Agostino Rossi
 George Rigaud as Gregg
 Adolfo Celi as Mark Milford
 Jussara as Stetuaka
 Miguel Del Castillo as Manager
 Luciana Angiolillo
 Valentino Macchi
 Anny Degli Uberti
 Aldo Bonamano

See also
 Heist film

References

External links
 
 
 

1967 films
1960s heist films
1960s crime thriller films
West German films
English-language German films
English-language Italian films
English-language Spanish films
German crime thriller films
German heist films
Italian crime thriller films
Italian heist films
Spanish crime thriller films
Spanish heist films
Films directed by Giuliano Montaldo
Films scored by Ennio Morricone
Films set in Rio de Janeiro (city)
Constantin Film films
Paramount Pictures films
1960s English-language films
1960s Italian films
1960s German films